Florida Gas Transmission is a natural gas pipeline which brings gas from Texas, Louisiana, Mississippi, and Alabama into Florida. The pipeline is owned 50% by Energy Transfer Partners (Owner/Operator) and 50% by Kinder Morgan Partnership, each respectively representing units in Citrus Corporation (CitCor). Its FERC code is 34.

See also
GulfStream Natural Gas

References

Natural gas pipelines in the United States
Energy infrastructure in Florida
Kinder Morgan
Natural gas pipelines in Texas
Natural gas pipelines in Alabama
Natural gas pipelines in Mississippi
Natural gas pipelines in Florida